Darnell is a masculine given name and a surname. The surname refers to a group of people in medieval ages who grew a plant called Darnel, which had intoxicatory properties. The surname is of English and French origin. It may refer to one of the following people:

Given name

Darnell
Darnell Bing (born 1984), American footballer
Darnell Bristol, songwriter and former member of The Deele
Darnell Clash (born 1962), American football player
Darnell Coles (born 1962), American baseball player, third baseman & outfielder 
Darnell Dinkins (born 1977), American footballer
Darnell Dockett (born 1981), American footballer
Darnell Hillman (born 1949), American basketball player
Darnell Hunt (born 1962), American sociologist
Darnell Johnson (born 1998), English football (soccer) player
Darnell King (born 1990), American soccer player
Darnell Martin (born 1964), African-American film director
Darnell McDonald (born 1978), American baseball player
Darnell Mooney (born 1997), American football player
Darnell Nurse (born 1995), Canadian ice hockey player
Darnell Savage (born 1997), American football player
Darnell Swallow, a contestant on the 2008 series of Big Brother (UK)
Darnell Valentine (born 1959), American basketball player
Darnell Williams (born 1955), American actor
Darnell Wilson (born 1974), American boxer
Darnell Wright (born 2001), American football player

Darnelle
Darnelle Bailey-King (born 1997), English footballer

As a surname
Billy Darnell (1926–2007), American professional wrestler
Bruce Darnell (born 1957), American model and choreographer
Colleen Darnell (born 1980), American Egyptologist
Eric Darnell (born 1961), American film director
Erik Darnell (born 1982), American stock car racing driver
Gary Darnell (born 1948), American College football player and coach
James E. Darnell, American biologist
Jean Darnell (1889–1961), American silent film actress
John Coleman Darnell (born 1962), American Egyptologist
Larry Darnell (1928–1983), American singer
Linda Darnell (1923–1965), American film actress
Mike Darnell (born 1962), American television executive
Nicholas Henry Darnell (1807–1885), American politician
Regna Darnell (born 1943), American-Canadian anthropologist and professor
Riley Darnell (1940–2020), American politician
Robert B. Darnell (born 1957), American biologist

Fictional characters
Darnell Turner, a character from the American television show My Name Is Earl, played by Eddie Steeples
 Darnelle, a character from the 2005 film Beauty Shop, played by Keshia Knight Pulliam
 Darnelle, a character from the Xena: Warrior Princess episode, "The Dirty Half Dozen", played by Charles Mesure
Darnell, a Newgrounds character created by Tom Fulp.

Places
Darnell may also refer to;
Darnell, Ohio, an unincorporated community
Darnell Town, Virginia, a community in the United States

Given names
English given names
English-language unisex given names